Kanakadripalli is a village in Kurnool District, Andhra Pradesh, India. It belongs to the Rayalaseema Area. It is famous for kadapa stones and mines.

References

Villages in Kurnool district